Henrique de Beaurepaire-Rohan (12 May 1812 - 19 July 1894) was a Brazilian explorer, geographer, soldier and politician.

Biography
He was of French extraction. In 1845 he began the exploration of territory south of Rio de Janeiro. He penetrated into Paraguay. He visited Bonpland at Borja. He subsequently published the results of his exploration as Descripção de uma viagem de Cuyabá ao Rio de Janeiro (Rio de Janeiro, 1846).

He was promoted in 1850 to the rank of major of engineers, and appointed by the Brazilian government to collect statistical information on the interior provinces of the country. He eventually became lieutenant-general in the Brazilian Army. In 1877 he published the important geographical work entitled Etudios acerca da organização da carta geographica e da historia physica e politica do Brazil (1877).

References

External links
 

1812 births
1894 deaths
Brazilian generals
Brazilian geographers
Brazilian explorers
Brazilian nobility
Brazilian politicians
Brazilian people of French descent
People from Niterói